David McNab may refer to:
 David McNab (ice hockey) (born 1955), assistant general manager of the Anaheim Ducks
 David T. McNab (born 1947), Métis historian
 David McNab (footballer), footballer for Fulham